Sayur bayam or sayur bening is an Indonesian vegetable soup prepared from vegetables, primarily amaranth, in clear soup flavoured with temu kunci. It is commonly prepared as main course during breakfast or lunchtime.

Ingredients
Sayur bayam is made up of amaranth, corn, and moringa in a clear soup flavoured with temu kunci, bay leaves, garlic, and shallots. Fried shallots can also be added to sayur bayam.

See also

Cuisine of Indonesia
List of Indonesian soups

References

Indonesian soups
Vegetarian dishes of Indonesia
Vegetable dishes of Indonesia